Hardin Township is a township in Johnson County, Iowa, USA.

History
Hardin Township was organized in 1858. It is named after William Hardin, an early settler.

References

Townships in Johnson County, Iowa
Townships in Iowa
1858 establishments in Iowa